Badji Mokhtar - Annaba University, also called Annaba University or UBMA, is located in Annaba, Algeria, on the north eastern coast of Algeria.

Founded in 1975 and  organized into seven faculties. The university is named after , an Algerian freedom fighter who died during the Algerian War on 19 November 1954.

General
The university has 43,406 students, 2900 lecturers, and 1905 administrative and support staff. Badji Mokhtar - Annaba University offers courses at undergraduate and postgraduate level. Every year over 8,000 national and international graduate and postgraduate students are admitted to the university for study. BMAU is involved in bilateral exchange agreements.

See also
 List of universities in Algeria
 List of colleges and universities

References 

 Badji Mokhtar Annaba University
 Annaba Annaba City -Algeria-

External links
 Badji Mokhtar Annaba University website 

 Badji Mokhtar Annaba University
1975 establishments in Algeria
Annaba
Buildings and structures in Annaba